In electrochemistry, a Randles circuit is an equivalent electrical circuit that consists of an active electrolyte resistance  in series with the parallel combination of the double-layer capacitance  and an impedance of a faradaic reaction. It is commonly used in electrochemical impedance spectroscopy (EIS) for interpretation of impedance spectra, often with a constant phase element (CPE) replacing the double layer capacity.
The Randles equivalent circuit is one of the simplest possible models describing processes at the electrochemical interface. In real electrochemical systems, impedance spectra are usually more complicated and, thus, the Randles circuit may not give appropriate results.

Explanation
Figure 1 shows the equivalent circuit initially proposed by John Edward Brough Randles for modeling of interfacial electrochemical reactions in presence of semi-infinite linear diffusion of electroactive particles to flat electrodes. A simple model for an electrode immersed in an electrolyte is simply the series combination of the ionic resistance, with the double layer capacitance, . The key assumption is that the rate of the faradaic reaction is controlled by diffusion of the reactants to the electrode surface.

In this model, the impedance of a faradaic reaction consists of an active charge transfer resistance  and a specific electrochemical element of diffusion , represented by a Warburg element 
 
where 
 is the Warburg coefficient;
 is an imaginary unit;
 is the angular frequency.

Identifying the Warburg element
In a simple situation, the Warburg element manifests itself in EIS spectra by a line with an angle of 45 degrees in the low frequency region. Figure 2 shows an example of EIS spectrum (presented in the Nyquist plot) simulated using the following parameters:  = 20 Ω,  = 25 μF,  = 100 Ω,  = 300 Ω•s−0.5.
Values of the charge transfer resistance and Warburg coefficient depend on physico-chemical parameters of a system under investigation. To obtain the Randles circuit parameters, the fitting of the model to the experimental data should be performed using complex nonlinear least-squares procedures available in numerous EIS data fitting computer programs.

References 

A. Lasia. Electrochemical impedance spectroscopy and its applications. In: Modern Aspects of Electrochemistry. Volume 32. Kluwer Academic/Plenum Pub. 1999, Ch.2, p. 143.

Analog circuits